The Battle of Ghazni was fought in 998 between the rival Ghaznavid forces of Amir Ismail and the rebel forces of his older brother Mahmud of Ghazni.

On his death-bed Amir Sabuktigin had designated Ismail as his successor while Mahmud, the older brother who was involved in the Samanids civil war, was stationed in Nishapur.

Upon receiving these news Mahmud contested Ismail's right to the throne and divested his charge of Nishapur to his uncle Borghuz and younger brother Nur-ud-Din Yusuf and marched upon Ghazni. Both armies met at Ghazni, Ismail's containing elephants. The battle was a long, drawn out affair, but at an opportune moment Mahmud charged Ismail's center which broke up. Mahmud would capture his brother and take the crown.

Notes

References 
 Kaushik Roy, Warfare in Pre-British India – 1500BCE to 1740CE, Routledge, 2015.

Ghazni 998
History of Ghazni Province
Ghazni 998
998
Wars of succession involving the states and peoples of Asia